Panchayati Hall is a Hindu temple devoted to the goddess Durga and Shiva, located in Jaipur, India.

See also
 Khudabad
 Khudabadi Script
Purswani

Hindu temples in Rajasthan
Buildings and structures in Jaipur